John Watson became editor of The South End, the daily student newspaper of Wayne State University, in 1968, transforming the paper into a public resource "with the intention of promoting the interests of impoverished, oppressed, exploited, and powerless victims of white, racist monopoly capitalism and imperialism" (first editorial by Watson in Sept. 26, 1968). 
As member of both the Black Panthers and the Detroit-based Dodge Revolutionary Union Movement (DRUM), John Watson represented the American black liberation movement at the international anti-imperialist conference organized in December 1968 in Italy.

See also 
League of Revolutionary Black Workers

2001 deaths
African-American activists
Year of birth missing
Members of the Black Panther Party
Members of the League of Revolutionary Black Workers